MNN may refer to:

 Madrid Nuevo Norte, an urban redevelopment programme
 Manhattan Neighborhood Network
 Medical News Network
 Mission Network News
 Menston railway station in the United Kingdom
 Minnesota Northern Railroad
 Mother Nature Network, a website
 Multifocal motor neuropathy, medical condition
 Maritime News Network, a radio news network owned by MBS
Peace is Our Nation, a political coalition of Montenegro